is a railway station in the city of Kasugai, Aichi Prefecture, Japan, operated by Central Japan Railway Company (JR Tōkai).

Lines
Jōkōji Station is served by the Chūō Main Line, and is located 368.8 kilometers from the starting point of the line at Tokyo Station and 28.1 kilometers from Nagoya Station.

Station layout
The station has two opposed side platforms connected by a level crossing and located on an embankment with the station building below. The station building has automated ticket machines, TOICA automated turnstiles and is unattended.

Platforms

Adjacent stations

|-
!colspan=5|JR Central

Station history
Along with the division and privatization of JNR on April 1, 1987, the station came under the control and operation of the Central Japan Railway Company.

Passenger statistics
In fiscal 2017, the station was used by an average of 157 passengers daily (arriving passengers only).

Surrounding area
Tōkai Nature Trail
Kakegawa Elementary School
Aigi Tunnel

See also
 List of Railway Stations in Japan

References

External links

Railway stations in Japan opened in 1924
Railway stations in Aichi Prefecture
Chūō Main Line
Stations of Central Japan Railway Company
Kasugai, Aichi